Shawn Michael Howard (born July 31, 1969) is an American film, television and theater actor.

Howard was born in Newark, New Jersey, the son of Olivia C. and Frank Howard, Jr., brother of Brad Howard and Tyrone Scott Howard. Father of Elijah Howard  Shawn moved to Manhattan at age 19 to study acting at New York University. He began working off-Broadway while still in school, in Mac Wellman's Crowbar, which won the obie for Best Play. He worked in character roles on episodic television in New York City, and his first film role came opposite Tupac Shakur in Above the Rim. In 1994 he moved to Hollywood and starred in Sunset Park with Terrence Howard. A succession of recurring television roles led to his breakthrough role as Russell on the NBC sitcom The Single Guy in 1995. He has been a featured guest voice on many animated shows, including American Dad!, Family Guy, and Robot Chicken. He voiced the character "Smokey" on the animated series The PJs with Eddie Murphy.

Filmography

Film

Television

Videogames

References

External links
 

1969 births
Tisch School of the Arts alumni
American male film actors
American male television actors
Living people
20th-century American male actors
21st-century American male actors
American male voice actors
Male actors from Newark, New Jersey